Jorge Emanuel Broun (born 23 May 1986), commonly known as Fatu Broun, is an Argentine professional footballer who plays as a goalkeeper for Rosario Central.

Career

Rosario Central
Born in Rosario, Broun began his career at Rosario Central. He made his debut in Torneo Clausura 2006 in a match that Rosario Central lost 2-0 against Club Atlético Banfield. He became the first choice keeper after the sale of Cristian Darío Álvarez at RCD Espanyol in 2008.
He is the only goalkeeper in the history of Rosario Central that has scored a goal. On 23 October 2009, Broun converted a penalty kick against Independiente.

Broun spent the 2013–14 season on loan with Chilean Primera División club Antofagasta.

Colón
In July 2014, Broun joined Club Atlético Colón on loan, with whom won promotion to Argentine Primera División. In January 2016, he signed for the club permanently. Broun spent in general four seasons at Estadio B.G. Estanislao López, making 97 league appearances.

Ludogorets
On 30 June 2017, Broun signed with Bulgarian First League champions Ludogorets Razgrad. He made his debut for the club on 19 July 2017 in a 4–1 Champions League second qualifying round second-leg win over Žalgiris.

On 13 December 2019, Broun left Ludogorets Razgrad by mutual consent.

Honours
Ludogorets
Bulgarian First League (2): 2017–18, 2018–19
Bulgarian Supercup (2): 2018, 2019

References

External links
Jorge Broun at Soccerway

1986 births
Living people
Footballers from Rosario, Santa Fe
Argentine footballers
Argentine expatriate footballers
Association football goalkeepers
Argentine people of Scottish descent
Rosario Central footballers
C.D. Antofagasta footballers
Club Atlético Colón footballers
PFC Ludogorets Razgrad players
Club de Gimnasia y Esgrima La Plata footballers
Chilean Primera División players
Argentine Primera División players
First Professional Football League (Bulgaria) players
Argentine expatriate sportspeople in Chile
Expatriate footballers in Chile
Argentine expatriate sportspeople in Bulgaria
Expatriate footballers in Bulgaria